The 1933 World Table Tennis Championships women's doubles was the sixth edition of the women's doubles championship.
Mária Mednyánszky and Anna Sipos defeated Emilné Rácz and Magda Gál in the final by three sets to one.

Results

See also
List of World Table Tennis Championships medalists

References

-
-